Ion Stoica is a Romanian-American computer scientist specializing in distributed systems, cloud computing and computer networking. He is a professor of computer science at the University of California, Berkeley and co-director of AMPLab. He co-founded Conviva and Databricks with other original developers of Apache Spark.

As of April 2022, Forbes ranked him and Matei Zaharia as the 3rd-richest people in Romania with a net worth of $1.6 billion.

Education
Stoica was born in Romania, where he grew up and attended Polytechnic University of Bucharest, receiving a MS in Electrical Engineering and Computer Science in 1989. He moved to the USA in 1994 to start a PhD at Old Dominion University with computer-science professor Hussein Abdel-Wahab. In 1996, he transferred to Carnegie Mellon University (CMU), where in 2000 he received a PhD in Electrical & Computer Engineering supervised by Hui Zhang. 
Subjects included Chord (peer-to-peer), Core-Stateless Fair Queueing (CSFQ), and Internet Indirection Infrastructure (i3).

Career and research
Stoica has been a Berkeley professor since 2000. His research interests include cloud computing, networking,  distributed systems and big data. He has authored or co-authored more than 100 peer reviewed papers in various areas of computer science.

Stoica was a co-founder and Chief Technology Officer (CTO) of Conviva in 2006, a company that came out of the End System Multicast project at CMU.
In 2013 he co-founded Databricks, serving as its chief executive until being replaced by Ali Ghodsi in January 2016, when he became executive chairman.

Awards
Stoica under the supervision of his doctoral advisor Hui Zhang (Chinese: 张晖) won the Association for Computing Machinery Ph.D. dissertation Award in 2001 for his thesis Stateless Core: A Scalable Approach for Quality of Service in the Internet (2000). Stoica is the recipient of a SIGCOMM Test of Time Award (2011), the 2007 CoNEXT Rising Star Award, a Sloan Foundation Fellowship (2003) and a PECASE Award (2002).  Stoica is also an ACM Fellow.  In 2019, Stoica received the SIGOPS Mark Weiser Award.

Philanthropy
In June of 2021, Berkeley announced that Stoica had donated $25 million toward the university's computing and data science initiatives, making him and colleague Scott Shenker two of Berkeley's largest benefactors.

References

Living people
American computer scientists
Romanian emigrants to the United States
American people of Romanian descent
Romanian computer scientists
Politehnica University of Bucharest alumni
Carnegie Mellon University College of Engineering alumni
UC Berkeley College of Engineering faculty
Fellows of the Association for Computing Machinery
Year of birth missing (living people)

Publications 

List of publications, Berkeley website